Sindhi Canadians ( (Perso-Arabic); सिंधी कनाडाई (Devanagari);) refer to Sindhis that are citizens of Canada or those that have ancestry or heritage from Sindh, Sindhi Canadians come under the global Sindhi diaspora. The population of Sindhis in Canada is estimated between 8,385 or 11,000 Sindhis in Canada. mainly concentrated in Toronto

History 
On the occasion of Sindhi Cultural Day, the Canadian prime minister Justin Trudeau sent heartful greetings for Sindhis.

Jeremy Patzer a conservative parliamentarian rose up to recognize Sindhi as one of the official languages of Canada.

References

External links 

 Sindhi Association of Canada
 Sindhi Foundation
 Sindhi Association of North America

Sindhi people
Sindhi diaspora
Indian diaspora in Canada
Pakistani diaspora in Canada
Canadian people of Sindhi descent
Canadian people of Indian descent
Canadian people of Pakistani descent
Ethnic groups in Canada